Walter Magnifico (born June 18, 1961 in San Severo, Italy) is a former Italian professional basketball player and coach. At a height of 2.09 m (6'10 ") tall, he played at the power forward and center positions. He is considered to be one of the best Italian basketball players ever, and he was among the 105 player nominees for the 50 Greatest EuroLeague Contributors list.

Professional career
After playing with the junior teams of Cestistica San Severo, Magnifico spent most of his pro career with VL Pesaro, thus becoming one of the club's emblems. While in Pesaro, he led his team to a Saporta Cup title in 1983, two Italian League championships, in 1988 and 1990, and to two Italian Cup titles, in 1985 and 1992. He also won a third Italian Cup, after his transfer to Virtus Bologna, in 1997.

National team career
Magnifico was a regular member of the senior Italian national team. He helped Italy win the bronze medal at the 1985 EuroBasket, and the silver medal at the 1991 EuroBasket.

References

External links
Fibaeurope.com profile
Euroleague.net 50 greatest contributors - nominees

1961 births
Living people
Basketball players at the 1984 Summer Olympics
Centers (basketball)
Fortitudo Pallacanestro Bologna players
Italian basketball coaches
Italian men's basketball players
Nuova AMG Sebastiani Basket Rieti players
Olympic basketball players of Italy
Pallacanestro Virtus Roma players
People from San Severo
Power forwards (basketball)
Victoria Libertas Pallacanestro players
Virtus Bologna players
1986 FIBA World Championship players
Sportspeople from the Province of Foggia